Eric Stanford (b.1932-2020) was an English sculptor. He studied at the St. Martin's School of Art and the University of Reading. He worked as a lecturer at the Berkshire College of Art and, from 1968 to 1989, he was Keeper of Art at Reading Museum and Art Gallery.

Public art by Eric Stanford

References

English sculptors
Living people
Modern sculptors
1932 births